Marek Růžička (born April 10, 1995) is a Czech professional ice hockey player. He is currently playing for Corsaires de Dunkerque of the FFHG Division 1 in France.

Růžička made his Czech Extraliga debut playing with HC Oceláři Třinec during the 2013-14 Czech Extraliga season. He also played for HC Litvínov.

References

External links

1995 births
Living people
AZ Havířov players
Czech ice hockey forwards
Diables Noirs de Tours players
HK Dukla Trenčín players
SHK Hodonín players
HC Litvínov players
HC Oceláři Třinec players
HC Olomouc players
People from Hodonín
Sportspeople from the South Moravian Region
Czech expatriate ice hockey players in Slovakia
Czech expatriate sportspeople in France
Expatriate ice hockey players in France